Flavius Hypatius (died 532) was a Eastern Roman noble of Imperial descent who held the position of commander in the East during the reign of Justin I, and was chosen by the mob as emperor during the Nika riots in Constantinople against Justinian I and executed shortly thereafter.

Life 

Hypatius was the nephew of Emperor Anastasius I, who ruled before Justin, and he was also associated by marriage to the noble Anicii clan, which gave him a serious claim to the imperial diadem; however, Hypatius showed no such ambition, and he and the other nephews of Anastasius were well-treated by both Justin and his successor to the Byzantine throne, Justinian I.

In the height of the Nika riots, Hypatius, along with his brother Pompeius and Probus (another nephew of Anastasius), were among the prime candidates for the imperial throne. As it became clear that the mob wanted a new emperor, Probus fled the city and Hypatius and Pompeius took shelter in the Imperial Palace, along with Justinian and the rest of the Byzantine Senate. They did not wish to rebel against Justinian, fearing they would have too little popular support.

Nevertheless, Justinian, fearing treachery, expelled the Senate from the Palace, thus ushering the two brothers into the mob's arms. Hypatius was dragged away from his house, despite the efforts of his wife, Mary, to prevent this, and was proclaimed emperor by the rioting mob at the Hippodrome. Hypatius seems to have thereafter overcome his initial reluctance, and began to play up to the part of emperor.

However, the riots were soon successfully (if bloodily) quelled by the Imperial Guard, and Hypatius was captured by Justinian's men. Justinian is reported to have wanted to spare Hypatius's life, but his wife Theodora prevailed upon him to see the punishment meted out, and the involuntary usurper was executed.

See also 
 Anastasian War and Vitalian for his campaigns.

Bibliography 
 
 
 

532 deaths
Year of birth unknown
5th-century Roman consuls
6th-century Byzantine people
Flavii
Byzantine usurpers
Imperial Roman consuls
Executed Byzantine people
People of the Roman–Sasanian Wars
6th-century executions by the Byzantine Empire
House of Leo
Anastasian War